Howsham is a village and civil parish in the Ryedale district of North Yorkshire, England.   It is home to a small parish church and Howsham Hall. Howsham appeared as Husun in the Domesday Book. The village is part of the historic East Riding of Yorkshire.

Howsham was served by Howsham railway station on the York to Scarborough Line between 1845 and 1849.

Gallery

References

External links

Villages in North Yorkshire
Civil parishes in North Yorkshire